The Rocketdyne RS-2200 was an experimental linear aerospike rocket engine developed by Rocketdyne for Lockheed Martin's VentureStar program. The program was ultimately cancelled in 2001 before any RS-2200 engines were assembled.

XRS-2200 

The XRS-2200 was a subscale testbed engine that was intended to be developed into the full-scale RS-2200. This engine, unlike its full-scale counterpart, made it to the test stand and accumulated approximately 1,600 seconds of hot-fire testing.

References 

Rocketdyne engines
Rocket engines of the United States
Rocketdyne
Rocket engines